In mathematics, the support function hA of a non-empty closed convex set A in 
describes the (signed) distances of supporting hyperplanes of A from the origin.
Any non-empty closed convex set A  is uniquely determined by   hA. Furthermore, the support function, as a function of the set A, is compatible with many natural geometric operations, like scaling, translation, rotation and Minkowski addition. 
Due to these properties, the support function is one of the most central basic concepts in convex geometry.

Definition
The support function    

; see

. Its interpretation is most intuitive when x is a unit vector: 
by definition, A is contained in the closed half space 
 
and there is at least one point of A in the boundary

of this half space. The hyperplane H(x) is therefore called a supporting hyperplane 
with exterior (or outer) unit normal vector x.
The word exterior is important here, as 
the orientation of x plays a role, the set H(x) is in general different from  H(-x).
Now  hA is the (signed) distance of H(x) from the origin.

Examples

The support function of the Euclidean unit ball  is   where  is the 2-norm.

If A is a line segment through the origin with endpoints -a and a then .

Properties

As a function of x
The support function of a compact nonempty convex set is real valued and continuous, but if the 
set is closed and unbounded, its support function is extended real valued (it takes the value  
). As any nonempty closed convex set is the intersection of
its supporting half spaces, the function hA determines A uniquely.  
This can be used to describe certain geometric properties of convex sets analytically. 
For instance, a set A is point symmetric with respect to the origin if and only if hA
is an even function.

In general, the support function is not differentiable. 
However, directional derivatives exist and yield support functions of support sets. If A is compact and convex, 
and hA'(u;x) denotes the directional derivative of
hA at u ≠ 0 in direction x,
we have 

Here H(u) is the supporting hyperplane of A with exterior normal vector u, defined
above. If A ∩ H(u) is a singleton {y}, say, it follows that the support function is differentiable at 
u and its gradient coincides with y. Conversely, if hA is differentiable at u, then A ∩ H(u) is a singleton. Hence hA is differentiable at all points u ≠ 0 
if and only if A is strictly convex (the boundary of A does not contain any line segments).

More generally, when  is convex and closed then for any ,

It follows directly from its definition that the support function is positive homogeneous:

and subadditive:

It follows that hA is a convex function. 
It is crucial in convex geometry that these properties characterize support functions:
support function of a nonempty compact convex set. Several proofs are known
,
one is using the fact that the Legendre transform of a positive homogeneous, convex, real valued function 
is the (convex) indicator function of a compact convex set.

Many authors restrict  the support function to the Euclidean unit sphere 
and consider it as a function on Sn-1. 
The homogeneity property shows that this restriction determines the 

As a function of A
The support functions of a dilated or translated set are closely related to the original set A:

and 

The latter generalises to 

where A + B denotes the Minkowski sum:

The Hausdorff distance   
of two nonempty compact convex sets A and B can be expressed in terms of support functions, 
 
where, on the right hand side, the uniform norm on the unit sphere is used.

The properties of the support function as a function of the set A are sometimes summarized in saying
that :A  h A maps the family of non-empty
compact convex sets to the cone of all real-valued continuous functions on the sphere whose positive 
homogeneous extension is convex. Abusing terminology slightly,   
is sometimes called linear, as it respects Minkowski addition, although it is not 
defined on a linear space, but rather on an (abstract) convex cone of nonempty compact convex sets. 
The mapping  is an isometry between this cone, endowed with the Hausdorff metric, and 
a subcone of the family of continuous functions on Sn-1 with the uniform norm.

Variants
In contrast to the above, support functions are sometimes defined on the boundary of A rather than on 
Sn-1, under the assumption that there exists a unique exterior unit normal at each boundary point. 
Convexity is not needed for the definition.
For an oriented regular surface, M, with a unit normal vector, N, defined everywhere on its surface, the support function 
is then defined by
 .
In other words, for any , this support function gives the 
signed distance of the unique hyperplane that touches M in x.

See also 
 Barrier cone
 Supporting functional

References

Convex geometry
Types of functions